Józef Wieczorek (6 January 1931 – 1 March 2003) was a Polish footballer. He played in two matches for the Poland national football team in 1953.

References

External links
 

1931 births
2003 deaths
Polish footballers
Poland international footballers
Place of birth missing
Association footballers not categorized by position